The year 1694 in science and technology involved some significant events.

Botany
 Joseph Pitton de Tournefort publishes Éléments de botanique ou méthode pour reconnaître les plantes.
 Rudolf Jakob Camerarius publishes De Sexu Plantarum Epistola in which he demonstrates the role of stamens and pistils in plant reproduction.

Births
 June 26 – Georg Brandt, Swedish chemist (died 1768)

Deaths
 November 29 – Marcello Malpighi, Italian physiologist (born 1628)

References

 
17th century in science
1690s in science